Holidays in Anguilla are predominantly religious holidays, with a number of additional national holidays.  The most important holiday in the Territory is Separation day, which celebrates the separation of the island from Saint Kitts and Nevis.

Where fixed date holidays (such as Christmas Day and Boxing Day) fall on a weekend, the holiday is taken in lieu on the next succeeding working day.

See also
List of holidays by country

References

Anguilla
Anguillan culture
Anguilla
Holidays
Anguilla